Haplochromis mbipi is a species of cichlid endemic to Lake Victoria where it is known from the southeastern portion of the lake.  This shallow water species, is generally found along gently sloping rocky shores.  This species can reach a length of  SL.  This species was originally described in the genus Mbipia, however not all scientists have accepted such placement.  It may be placed back in Mbipia should a comprehensive review of the genus Haplochromis be conducted.

References

mbipi
Fish described in 1998
Fish of Lake Victoria
Taxonomy articles created by Polbot